Cratera is a genus of land planarians found in South America.

Description 

The genus Cratera is characterized by having a leaf-shaped body. Most species are between 3 and 7 cm long. The hundreds of eyes distributed along the body are monolobulated, i.e., simple and circular. The copulatory apparatus has a permanent conical penis occupying the entire male cavity. The final portion of the ejaculatory duct, the channel that guides sperm through the penis, has an expanded cavity that resembles a volcanic crater. It is very similar to the related genus Obama, the main difference being the presence of trilobulated eyes in the latter.

Etymology 
The name Cratera is derived from the Latin word crater and refers to the cavity in the penis that resembles a volcanic crater.

Species 
There are 24 species assigned to the genus Cratera:

Cratera anamariae Carbayo & Almeida, 2015
Cratera arucuia Lago-Barcia & Carbayo, 2018
Cratera assu Araujo, Carbayo, Riutort & Álvarez-Presas, 2020
Cratera aureomaculata Rossi & Leal-Zanchet, 2017
Cratera boja Araujo, Carbayo, Riutort & Álvarez-Presas, 2020
Cratera crioula (E. M. Froehlich, 1955)
Cratera cryptolineata Rossi & Leal-Zanchet, 2017
Cratera cuarassu Carbayo & Almeida, 2015
Cratera hina (Marcus, 1951)
Cratera imbiri Araujo, Carbayo, Riutort & Álvarez-Presas, 2020
Cratera joia (Froehlich, 1956)
Cratera nigrimarginata Rossi & Leal-Zanchet, 2017
Cratera ochra Rossi, Amaral, Ribeiro, Cauduro, Fick, Valiati & Leal-Zanchet, 2015
Cratera obsidiana Amaral, Boll & Leal-Zanchet, 2019
Cratera paraitinga Araujo, Carbayo, Riutort & Álvarez-Presas, 2020
Cratera picuia Lago-Barcia & Carbayo, 2018
Cratera pseudovaginuloides (Riester, 1938)
Cratera steffeni Rossi, Fontoura, Amaral & Leal-Zanchet, 2014
Cratera tamoia (E. M. Froehlich, 1955)
Cratera taxiarcha (Marcus, 1951)
Cratera tui Araujo, Carbayo, Riutort & Álvarez-Presas, 2020
Cratera viridimaculata Negrete & Brusa, 2016
Cratera yara (E. M. Froehlich, 1955)

References 

Geoplanidae
Rhabditophora genera